Nigar may refer to:
 Nigar Awards, the oldest Pakistani film awards
 Nigar (magazine), Pakistan-based entertainment magazine
 Nigâr, a character in Karagöz and Hacivat plays

Given name
Nigar Arpadarai (born 1982), Azerbaijani politician and businesswoman
Nigâr Hanım, Turkish poet
Nigar Hasan-Zadeh, Azerbaijani poets
Nigar Jamal, Azerbaijani singer
Eldar & Nigar, Azeri pop duo which includes Nigar Jamal
Nigaar Khan, Indian television actress
Nigar Nazar, Pakistani cartoonist
Nigar Rafibeyli, Azerbaijani writer
Nigar Shikhlinskaya, Azerbaijani nurse
Nigar Sultana (actress), Indian actress
Negar Khan, Norwegian-Iranian actress

Places
Nigar, alternate name of Negar, a city in Iran
Nigar, alternate name of Negar-e Bala, a village in Iran

See also
 Nigga
 Nigger (disambiguation)
 Niger (disambiguation)
 Nigra (disambiguation)